Hajat Aqa (also Romanized as Ḩājat Āqā; also known as Ḩājat Āghā) is a village in Zirkuh Rural District, Bagh-e Bahadoran District, Lenjan County, Isfahan Province, Iran. At the 2006 census, its population was 773, in 205 families.

References 

Populated places in Lenjan County